The 2021 Nagoya Grampus season is Nagoya Grampus' 4th season back in the J1 League following their relegation at the end of the 2016 season, their 28th J1 League season and 38th overall in the Japanese top flight. Nagoya Grampus will participate in the J1 League, Emperor's Cup, J. League Cup and the AFC Champions League.

Season events

On 28 December, Nagoya Grampus announced the signing of Kazuki Nagasawa from Urawa Red Diamonds.

On 29 December, Nagoya Grampus announced the signing of Ryoya Morishita from Sagan Tosu.

On 7 January, Jonathan Matsuoka was loaned to Kamatamare Sanuki until 31 January 2022.

On 9 January, Nagoya Grampus announced the signing of Manabu Saitō from Kawasaki Frontale, whilst Daiki Enomoto was loaned to Ehime until 31 January 2022.

On 15 January, Nagoya Grampus announced the permanent signing of Mu Kanazaki from Sagan Tosu after he'd spent the 2020 season on loan at Nagoya Grampas.

On 16 January, Shuto Watanabe was loaned to Mito HollyHock until 31 January 2022.

On 11 March, the Asian Football Confederation confirmed that Thailand would host Nagoya Grampus' group G games in the 2021 AFC Champions League.

On 20 July, Nagoya Grampus announced the signing of Jakub Świerczok from Piast Gliwice.

On 12 August, Nagoya Grampus announced the signing of Kim Min-tae on loan from Hokkaido Consadole Sapporo for the remainder of the season.

On 9 December, Head Coach Massimo Ficcadenti left the club after his contract expired.

Squad

Out on loan

Transfers

In

Loans in

Out

Loans out

Friendlies

Competitions

J. League

Results summary

Results by round

Results

League table

Emperor's Cup

J. League Cup

Knockout stage

Final

AFC Champions League

Group stage

Knockout stage

Squad statistics

Appearances and goals

|-
|colspan="14"|Players away on loan:
|-
|colspan="14"|Players who left Nagoya Grampus during the season:
|}

Goal Scorers

Clean sheets

Disciplinary record

References

Nagoya Grampus
Nagoya Grampus seasons